Petersham is a village in the London Borough of Richmond upon Thames on the east of the bend in the River Thames south of Richmond, which it shares with neighbouring Ham. It provides the foreground of the scenic view from Richmond Hill across Petersham Meadows, with Ham House further along the river. Other nearby places include Twickenham, Isleworth,  Teddington, Mortlake and Roehampton.

History

Petersham appears in the Domesday Book of 1086 as Patricesham. It was held by Chertsey Abbey. Its assets were: 4 hides; 1 church, 5 ploughs, 1 fishery worth 1000 eels and 1000 lampreys,  of meadow. It rendered £6 10s 0d.

The village was the birthplace in 1682 of Archibald Campbell, later 3rd Duke of Argyll and Earl of Islay. He went on to found the Royal Bank of Scotland in Edinburgh in 1727, and his face is on the obverse of all of the Royal Bank's current paper banknotes.

The explorer George Vancouver retired to Petersham, where he wrote A Voyage Of Discovery to the North Pacific Ocean, and Round the World. It is thought that he lived in what is now called Glen Cottage in River Lane. He died in 1798 and is buried in the churchyard of Petersham Parish Church. The Portland stone monument over his grave, renovated in the 1960s, is now Grade II listed in view of its historical associations.

In 1847 Queen Victoria granted Pembroke Lodge in the Petersham part of Richmond Park to John Russell, 1st Earl Russell, and it became the Russell family home. Lord Russell's grandson, Bertrand Russell, spent some of his childhood there. During World War II the GHQ Liaison Regiment (also known as Phantom) established its regimental headquarters nearby at The Richmond Hill Hotel, with its base (including the officers' mess and billet) at Pembroke Lodge.

In the early 19th century, Charles Stanhope, styled Lord Petersham, later Earl of Harrington, gave the Petersham name to a type of greatcoat.

Landmarks

Notable buildings
Listed buildings include a watchman's box that also served as a village lock-up and dates from 1787.

Petersham Road (part of the A307) includes an extremely sharp right-angled bend edged by a pair of handsome wrought-iron gates.  This is the entrance to Montrose House, one of the most notable houses in Petersham.  After a spate of serious accidents on the bend in the road, the neighbours formed a group in the 1850s called Trustees of the Road.  The Hon. Algernon Tollemache of Ham House was their leader and they managed to persuade the owner of Montrose House to part with some land to reduce the sharpness of the bend.  But various dents in the brick wall today reveal that motorists are still taken unawares by it.

Adjacent to Montrose House and equally as impressive is Rutland Lodge, built in 1666 for a Lord Mayor of London.

Another historic house in Petersham is Douglas House, just off the west drive to Ham House.  One of its notable inhabitants was Catherine, Duchess of Queensberry.  In 1969 it was bought by the Federal Republic of Germany for use as a German school.  New buildings have been erected in the grounds, but the original house and stables have been preserved.

Transport
Petersham is served by only two bus routes: the 65 and 371, both linking the village with Richmond and Kingston upon Thames.

Education

 Deutsche Schule, London (The German School London) is based at Douglas House.
 The Russell Primary School on  Petersham Road was previously called the Orchard Primary School.
 The Russell School on Petersham Road was founded in 1851 by Lord John Russell who served twice as Britain's Prime Minister. It was originally located in Richmond Park, near Petersham Gate, irreparably damaged by a bomb in 1943 and demolished.
 Sudbrook School is a nursery school housed in Petersham's village hall on Bute Avenue.

Religious sites

St Peter's Church

Petersham Parish Church is believed to pre-date the Norman conquest of England as a church at Petersham is mentioned in Domesday Book (1086).

All Saints' Church

All Saints' on Bute Avenue was built as a church but was never consecrated. It was built between 1899 and 1909 by Leeds architect John Kelly for Mrs Rachael Warde (née Walker) (1841–1906) as a memorial to her parents who had lived at Petersham House. During World War II it was used as an Anti-Aircraft Command post  and it has also been used as a recording studio and as a filming location. It is now a private residence.

Sport
Richmond Golf Club, a private golf club,  is situated in the historic Sudbrook Park, adjacent to Richmond Park. The Grade I listed building Sudbrook House, in the park, has been its clubhouse since 1898. 

Ham and Petersham Cricket Club, whose home matches are played in Ham, was established in 1815.

Ranelagh Harriers running club is based behind The Dysart restaurant.

Notable people

Living people
Shirley Bloomer (born 1934), who won three Grand Slam tennis titles during her tennis-playing career, is the widow of Chris Brasher (see Historical figures below): they brought up their family in Petersham.
Michael Frayn (b. 1933), playwright and novelist, and his wife Claire Tomalin (born 1933), journalist and biographer, live in Petersham.
 The entertainer Tommy Steele (b. 1936) bought Montrose House in 1969. He sold it in about 2004.
 Lynne Truss (b. 1955), author, journalist, novelist, and radio broadcaster and dramatist, grew up in Petersham.
Peter Voser (b. 1958), the former CEO of Royal Dutch Shell, lived in Petersham. He has since moved back to his native Switzerland.

Historical figures
Daisy Ashford (1881–1972), who is most famous for writing The Young Visiters, was born at Elm Lodge, Petersham.
Chris Brasher (1928–2003), athlete, sports journalist and co-founder of the London Marathon, lived in River Lane, Petersham.
 The author and illustrator Charles George Harper (1863–1943) lived in Petersham in later life, and died there in 1943.
 Lodowick Carlell (1602–1675), courtier and playwright, and his wife Joan Carlile (c.1606–1679), portrait painter, lived at Petersham Lodge in Richmond Park. They are buried together in St Peter's churchyard but the location of their grave is not known. 
 Prince Rupert Loewenstein (1933–2014), aristocrat, merchant banker and longtime financial manager of The Rolling Stones, lived in Petersham Lodge in River Lane, a former grace-and-favour mansion, purchased for about £2 million in 1987. It is an early 18th-century house, built for Catherine Douglas, Duchess of Queensberry, and Grade II listed by Historic England.
Beverley Nichols (1898–1983), author, lived at Sudbrook Cottage in Sudbrook Park, Petersham with the actor and director Cyril Butcher (1909–1987). 
The businessman  Tony Rampton (1915–1993), who was chairman of the clothing retailer Freemans, lived at Gort Lodge, an early 18th-century Grade II listed house in Petersham, where he and his wife Joan, who were both philanthropists, brought up their family including their son Richard Rampton QC (born 1941), a libel lawyer. Tony and Joan Rampton are buried in St Peter's churchyard.
George Vancouver (1757–1798), Captain in the Royal Navy and one of Britain's greatest explorers and navigators, is thought to have lived in Glen Cottage on River Lane in Petersham; he is buried in St Peter's churchyard.

See also
German School London

References

Sources

External links

 Description and map of Petersham Conservation Area
 A community site run by residents of Petersham
 Ham Photos blog – hundreds of photos of Petersham with brief descriptions
 Photo of Petersham Lock-up
Richmond Local History Society, which covers Richmond, Kew, Ham and Petersham

 
Areas of London
Districts of London on the River Thames
Districts of the London Borough of Richmond upon Thames